Nunc, Sancte, nobis Spiritus is a Christian hymn which has traditionally been attributed to the fourth century St. Ambrose of Milan. However the earliest manuscript tradition for the hymn seems to only go back to the ninth century.  The hymn has traditionally been a core part of the prayers at Terce in the Liturgy of the Hours. The reason for this is that the Acts of the Apostles records an event at Pentecost where the apostles are filled with the Holy Spirit. The experience clearly causes the apostles to behave in an unusual way and in chapter 2 verse 15 the Acts of the Apostles states explicitly that the apostles were not drunk because it was only the third hour of the day (ie 9am). As the Acts of the Apostles was so explicit in linking the Pentecost experience of the Apostles to the third hour of the day, Christian hymns and prayers intended to be used at that time of the day, have traditionally made reference to the coming of the Holy Spirit.

Hymn in Latin

When used as a hymn, typically only three verses are used. The first three verses represent the version of the hymn which is generally used in the Roman Office, where the final verse is designed to be the same across a number of different hymns.

The Plain Chant melodies used with the Latin version of the hymn changes according to the seasons in the Liturgical Year. The different melodies can be found on the Liber Hymnarius website.

English translations

See also
 Ambrosian hymnography
 Christian liturgy
 Gregorian Chant
 Little Hours
 Liturgy of the Hours
 Plainsong
 Terce

Notes

Latin-language Christian hymns